Nicotiana langsdorffii, Langsdorff's tobacco, is a species of flowering plant in the nightshade family Solanaceae, native to Brazil.
 long. N. langsdorfii lacks fragrance, unlike some of the other tall species. It is grown as an ornamental garden plant.

Like other species in the genus, N. langsdorffii can cause severe discomfort and irritation if consumed.

This plant has gained the Royal Horticultural Society’s Award of Garden Merit.

Etymology 
The species name langsdorffii is in honour of G. I. Langsdorff, who was the Russian Consul in Rio de Janeiro. Langsdorf was responsible for an expedition to explore the interior of Brazil in the 1820s.

References 

Tobacco
langsdorffii
Garden plants